National Geographic Abu Dhabi (Arabic: ناشيونال جيوغرافيك أبوظبي) is a free-to-air documentary channel that started broadcasting on 1 July 2009. It is the official Arabic version of National Geographic Channel. The channel is based in Abu Dhabi, United Arab Emirates. Owned by National Geographic Society/The Walt Disney Company EMEA (Disney Middle East FZ LLC) and the Abu Dhabi Media Foundation.

External links 

Arabic-language television stations
Television stations in the United Arab Emirates
Television channels and stations established in 2009
Mass media in Abu Dhabi
2009 establishments in the United Arab Emirates